Boomgaarden is a surname. Notable people with the surname include:

Lynne J. Boomgaarden (born 1961), American judge
Rike Boomgaarden, German singer and songwriter